The Chandigarh Group of Colleges (or CGC) are the educational institutions located in Sahibzada Ajit Singh Nagar district of Punjab in short distance from cities of Chandigarh and Mohali. Chandigarh Group of Colleges was established in 2001 at Landran initially and at Jhanjeri in 2012.

Three different Institutions under CGC 
Even having a title with a similar name, the three groups of colleges i.e. CGC Landran, CGC Jhanjeri, and Chandigarh University, are three different educational institutions, different locations, and also the three have separate identities.

CGC Landran
In 2002, CGC Landran was setup under the affiliation of I. K. Gujral Punjab Technical University. Better known as Landran College, CGC Landran is offering many technical, pharma, management, arts and science courses. Landran is an interconnected urbanized village linked between three prominent towns or villages of Mohali i.e. Sohana, Kharar and Banur.

Campus activities and sports
CGC campus students get opportunities to be part of different cultural events like fashion shows, Faculty felicitation, NASA sponsored CanSat competition, MHRD's Smart India Hackathon events, Start up to Scale Up conferences, NCC best cadet, Faculty Development Programmes apart from annual Techno cultural Fests. CGC students also participate in many sports tournaments and competitions in events such as Volleyball, Wrestling, weightlifting, power lifting, best physique championships

Courses
CGC offers following courses,  such as:
 MTech (Computer Science & Engineering)
 MTech (System Software)
 MTech (Information Technology)
 MTech (Information Security)
 MTech (Electronics & Communication Engineering)
 MTech (VLSI Design)
 MTech (Mechanical Engineering)
 BTech (Computer Science & Engineering)
 BTech (Information Technology)
 BTech (Electronics & Communication Engineering)
 BTech (Mechanical Engineering)
 B. Pharmacy
 BBA (Service Industry Management)
 MBA (Master of Business Administration)
 MCA (Master of Computer Application)

CGC Jhanjeri

In 2012, CGC Jhanjeri was initiated as technical campus and currently running under separate administration in Jhanjeri. It is a village which connects two important cities i.e. Mohali and Sirhind-Fategarh.

CGC Gharuan or Chandigarh University

Initiated in 2009, CGC Gharaun later got University status by UGC in 2012 and is known as Chandigarh University.

Placements

4500 MNCs like Infosys, Wipro, Microsoft, Google, HCL, Larsen & Toubro Infotech, Tata Motors, Cadence, Dell, Polaris, SAP Labs, Adobe Systems, Citrix Systems, Oracle, Cognizant, Bharti Airtel, Deloitte, IBM, Tech Mahindra with more than 490 job offers visit the campus every year for placements for both Landran and Jhanjeri campuses. Though no. of placements does not ensure that the grabbed placements are high because most of the recruiters are mass recruiters. 

The highest placement gone is 1.07 cr. by off campus placement and on campus with 45.9 lakhs in the year 2022 at Amazon.

Research and development

Chandigarh Group of Colleges is among top 10 institutes of India in terms of number of patents filed. CGC has students like Sukhmandeep Singh who become successful in life after doing graduation from this college. CGC has MoU with National Institute of Electronics & Information Technology for Entrepreneurship, R&D Projects and training. CGC is member of AI and Deep learning project under Newton Bhabha Fund sanctioned by UK's Royal Academy of Engineering. CGC was granted  aid by Indian Council of Medical Research for the development of nanotechnology-based lung cancer vaccine.

Ranking
  Aspiring Minds' National Employability Award 2019
 Times Top 100 Private Engineering Institute rankings 2018- Top 50
 Chronicle 7th All India Engineering Survey - A++

See also
Chandigarh University
Thapar Institute of Engineering and Technology
Indian School of Business

References

External links
 Chandigarh Group of Colleges Landran
 Chandigarh Group of Colleges Jhanjeri
 Chandigarh Engineering College website

Engineering colleges in Chandigarh
Engineering colleges in Punjab, India
Educational institutions established in 2001
2001 establishments in Punjab, India